Sinocyclocheilus xunlensis is a species of cyprinid fish in the genus Sinocyclocheilus.

References 

xunlensis
Fish described in 2004